SOS2 may refer to:

 Son of Sevenless, a set of encoding genes
 Special ordered set of type 2, a structure in discrete optimization